Vils is a town in the district of Reutte in the Austrian state of Tyrol.  It has a long, rich history of ten or more generations of excellent luthiers. Most prominent among those of the Rief (or Ruef) family is Dominicus Rief. Examples of his work are in the museum there.

Geography
Vils lies on the German border with Bavaria. Shortly after passing through the town, the Vils River flows into the Lech.

References

Cities and towns in Reutte District